Nemanja Mitrović (born 15 October 1992) is a Slovenian footballer who plays as a defender for Maribor. He is of Serbian descent.

Career statistics

International

Scores and results list Slovenia's goal tally first, score column indicates score after each Mitrović goal.

Honours
Olimpija Ljubljana
Slovenian PrvaLiga: 2015–16

Maribor
Slovenian PrvaLiga: 2021–22

Notes

References

External links
NZS profile 

1992 births
Living people
Footballers from Ljubljana
Slovenian people of Serbian descent
Slovenian footballers
Slovenian expatriate footballers
Association football defenders
NK Olimpija Ljubljana (2005) players
Jagiellonia Białystok players
NK Maribor players
Slovenian PrvaLiga players
Ekstraklasa players
Slovenian expatriate sportspeople in Italy
Expatriate footballers in Italy
Slovenian expatriate sportspeople in Poland
Expatriate footballers in Poland
Slovenia youth international footballers
Slovenia under-21 international footballers
Slovenia international footballers